John Tautges is a veteran radio sports announcer with Dial Global. He has been a radio broadcaster for twenty three years.

Before Westwood One
Tautges started his career in Rapid City, South Dakota at a small radio station and was the public address announcer for the Detroit Red Wings. He also anchored sportscasts for the Associated Press Radio Network.

Career at Dial Global
He is the lead announcer for golf and college football. He also does play-by-play for college basketball during the regular season and does studio hosting for the NCAA Men's Division I Basketball Championship. He also did some studio hosting for the NFL on Westwood One and hosted Sports World Roundup. He also anchors the Wimbledon Championships for professional tennis. He also serves as a co-anchor for Dial Global's coverage of the Olympic Games. He has also hosted The Final Four Show and Championship Monday.

Personal
Tautges grew up in Minneapolis and resides in Alexandria, Virginia with his wife.

References
http://dialglobalsports.com/john-tautges/

American radio sports announcers
Sportspeople from Minneapolis
National Hockey League public address announcers
National Football League announcers
College basketball announcers in the United States
Golf writers and broadcasters
College football announcers
Tennis commentators
American talk radio hosts
Living people
Olympic Games broadcasters
Year of birth missing (living people)